The third season of the comedy-drama science fiction television series The Orville, also known as The Orville: New Horizons, premiered on June 2, 2022. It streams on Hulu in the United States and on Disney+ internationally. Filming began in October 2019 but was halted due to the COVID-19 pandemic, and production ultimately completed in August 2021. This season is the show's first on Hulu, after airing its previous two seasons on Fox, as well as the first to premiere since the acquisition of 21st Century Fox by Disney in March 2019.

Summary
Storylines for the season include the Union's conflict with the Kaylon, Claire's reconciliation with Isaac, Ed discovering that he shares a daughter with newly elected Krill chancellor Telayah, the reversal of Topa's sex-change operation and new crew member Charly Burke overcoming her bigotry towards Isaac for his part in her friend's death upon learning the origins of the Kaylon's own prejudice towards biologicals. Towards the end of the season, Moclus is expelled from the Union after Kelly and Bortus rescue Topa from a Moclan black site where she's tortured and nearly killed after agreeing to help Haveena smuggle newborn Moclan females (violating the agreement established in the previous season), so the Moclans form an alliance with the Krill against the Kaylon, who are coerced into a truce with the Union by a weapon powerful enough to wipe them out. Ironically, the Union are forced to ally with the Kaylon when the weapon falls into the hands of the Krill and the Moclans, culminating in a battle that does not come without sacrifice.

Cast

Main
 Seth MacFarlane as Captain Ed Mercer
 Adrianne Palicki as Commander Kelly Grayson
 Penny Johnson Jerald as Dr. Claire Finn
 Scott Grimes as Lieutenant Gordon Malloy
 Peter Macon as Lieutenant Commander Bortus
 Jessica Szohr as Lieutenant/Lieutenant Commander Talla Keyali
 J Lee as Lieutenant Commander John LaMarr
 Mark Jackson as Isaac
 Anne Winters as Ensign Charly Burke

Recurring 
 Norm Macdonald as Lt. Yaphit (voice)
 Kai Wener as Ty Finn
 BJ Tanner as Marcus Finn
 Victor Garber as Admiral Tom Halsey
 Kelly Hu as Admiral Ozawa
 Andi Chapman as Admiral Howland
 Chad L. Coleman as Klyden
 Imani Pullum as Topa

Guest

Development and production
Fox renewed the series for a third season in May 2019. In July 2019, it was announced that the series would be moving to Hulu, targeting a premiere date in late 2020.

Seth MacFarlane and Jon Cassar were the only directors for the third season. Filming began in October 2019, but was halted in March 2020 due to the COVID-19 pandemic, by which time approximately half of the season had been completed. Production resumed in December 2020 but was suspended once again in January 2021 following a COVID surge. Filming once again resumed in early February 2021 and wrapped in August. Norm Macdonald completed voiceover work as Lt. Yaphit prior to his death in September 2021, making it his final role. The premiere was dedicated to his memory. The episode "Gently Falling Rain" was dedicated to Lisa Banes, who completed her role as Speria Balask prior to her death in June 2021.

The season introduced some changes to the show's production design, such as updated uniforms and sets, as well as Isaac and the Kaylon being redesigned to appear more robotic.

Episodes

Novella 
The season was initially announced as consisting of eleven episodes, but one episode was not filmed due to pandemic-related travel restrictions. Titled "Sympathy for the Devil", it was instead adapted as a novelization written by MacFarlane, and takes place between "Midnight Blue" and "Domino". The audiobook is narrated by guest star Bruce Boxleitner. The novella was released on July 19, 2022.

Music

A soundtrack album for this third season of The Orville was released digitally by Hollywood Records on March 3, 2023.

Reception

Audience viewership 
According to Parrot Analytics, which looks at consumer engagement in consumer research, streaming, downloads, and on social media, The Orville: New Horizons was the 4th most in-demand streaming show in the United States, during the week ending August 26, 2022, and the 6th during the week ending September 9, 2022. According to the streaming aggregator JustWatch, The Orville: New Horizons was the 6th most streamed TV show across all platforms in the United States, during the week of June 5, 2022. For August 1–7, 2022, the week the third-season finale aired, Whip Media's analytics ranked The Orville as the fifth most watched streaming original series in the United States, and Hulu's second most watched series behind Only Murders in the Building.

Critical reception 
On Rotten Tomatoes, the third season has an approval rating of 100%, with an average rating of 8.25/10 based on 11 reviews.

Den of Geek reviewer Michael Winn Johnson awarded the first episode "Electric Sheep" five out of five stars. He gave a favorable appraisal of the Isaac-centric storyline for dealing with the themes of prejudice and suicide. Johnson also praised MacFarlane and his creative team for forging an "extremely strong identity" for the show despite its influence from other science fiction franchises particularly Star Trek. Remus Norona of Collider gave the first episode an A minus, stating that the season premiere is "bigger, bolder, and a whole lot darker." He noted that the first episode explored themes such as trauma, suicide, and grief.

Tell-Tale TV reviewer Nick Hogan observed that the third season had a higher budget than the previous two seasons, allowing more investment in both the practical and special effects. Hogan described the second episode "Shadow Realms" as a "cool, Alien-esque horror story that thrills both psychologically and physically" but criticised the "bloated" storyline. Reviewing the third episode "Mortality Paradox," Johnson praised the episode's writer Cherry Chevapravatdumrong for mixing the third season with "thrills, humor, adventure and even a little horror.

Digital Trends reviewer Michael Green praised the third season, describing it as a "loving homage" and the spiritual successor to Star Trek: The Next Generation. Green also praised the family dynamic between the main cast members' characters Seth McFarlane (Captain Ed Mercer), Adrianne Palicki (Commander Kelly Grayson), Penny Johnson Jerald (Dr Claire Finn), Mark Jackson (Isaac), Peter Macon (Bortus) and J. Lee (Chief Engineer John LaMarr). Green further praised The Orville high production values and gave a favorable appraisal of its stories which explored philosophical, intellectual and human interest issues. Green praised the Season 3 episode "Midnight Blue" for exploring the ethical dimensions of gender reassignment surgery and its cameo featuring Dolly Parton. He also gave a favorable appraisal of the time travel episode "Twice in a Lifetime" which explored tampering with the past and sacrificing one's family for the "greater good."

Notes

References

External links
 
 

The Orville
2022 American television seasons
Television productions suspended due to the COVID-19 pandemic